The 1844 United States presidential election in Maine took place between November 1 and December 4, 1844, as part of the 1844 United States presidential election. Voters chose nine representatives, or electors to the Electoral College, who voted for President and Vice President.

Maine voted for the Democratic candidate, James K. Polk, over Whig candidate Henry Clay. Polk won Maine by a margin of 13.35%.

With 5.69% of the popular vote, Maine would prove to be James G. Birney's fifth strongest state after New Hampshire, Massachusetts, Vermont and Michigan.

Results

See also
 United States presidential elections in Maine

References

Maine
1844
1844 Maine elections